Twarikh Guru Khalsa a historical book of the Sikhs from their origin to the time when they lost the Punjab to the British. The author of the book is Giani Gian Singh. The work is divided into five parts: 
Janam Sakhi Dasari Guruari presents biographies of  Guru Gobind Singh.
Shamsher Khalsa deals with the career of Banda Singh Bahadur.
Raj Khalsa describes the rise of the twelve misls.
Sardar Khalsa contained accounts of Sikh principalities.
Panth Khalsa treats of Sikh sects, gurdwaras and preaching centres.

References

History of Sikhism